Emerin is a protein that in humans is encoded by the EMD gene, also known as the STA gene. Emerin, together with LEMD3, is a LEM domain-containing integral protein of the inner nuclear membrane in vertebrates. Emerin is highly expressed in cardiac and skeletal muscle. In cardiac muscle, emerin localizes to adherens junctions within intercalated discs where it appears to function in mechanotransduction of cellular strain and in beta-catenin signaling. Mutations in emerin cause X-linked recessive Emery–Dreifuss muscular dystrophy, cardiac conduction abnormalities and dilated cardiomyopathy.

It is named after Alan Emery.

Structure 
Emerin is a 29.0 kDa (34 kDa observed MW) protein composed of 254 amino acids. Emerin is a serine-rich protein with an N-terminal 20-amino acid hydrophobic region that is flanked by charged residues; the hydrophobic region may be important for anchoring the protein to the membrane, with the charged terminal tails being cytosolic. In cardiac, skeletal, and smooth muscle, emerin localizes to the inner nuclear membrane; expression of emerin is highest in skeletal and cardiac muscle. In cardiac muscle specifically, emerin also resides at adherens junctions within intercalated discs.

Function 
Emerin is a serine-rich nuclear membrane protein and a member of the nuclear lamina-associated protein family. It mediates membrane anchorage to the cytoskeleton. Emery–Dreifuss muscular dystrophy is an X-linked inherited degenerative myopathy resulting from mutation in the EMD (also known clinically as STA) gene. Emerin appears to be involved in mechanotransduction, as emerin-deficient mouse fibroblasts failed to transduce normal mechanosensitive gene expression responses to strain stimuli. In cardiac muscle, emerin is also found complexed to beta-catenin at adherens junctions of intercalated discs, and cardiomyocytes from hearts lacking emerin showed beta-catenin redistribution as well as perturbed intercalated disc architecture and myocyte shape. This interaction appears to be regulated by glycogen synthase kinase 3 beta.

Clinical significance 
Mutations in emerin cause X-linked recessive Emery–Dreifuss muscular dystrophy, which is characterized by early contractures in the Achilles tendons, elbows and post-cervical muscles; muscle weakness proximal in the upper limbs and distal in lower limbs; along with cardiac conduction defects that range from sinus bradycardia, PR prolongation to complete heart block. In these patients, immunostaining of emerin is lost in various tissues, including muscle, skin fibroblasts, and leukocytes, however diagnostic protocols involve mutational analysis rather than protein staining. In nearly all cases, mutations result in a complete deletion, or undetectable levels, of emerin protein. Approximately 20% of cases have X chromosomes with an inversion within the Xq28 region.

Moreover, recent research have found that the absence of functional emerin may decrease the infectivity of HIV-1. Thus, it is speculated that patients with Emery–Dreifuss muscular dystrophy may have immunity to or show an irregular infection pattern to HIV-1.

Interactions 
Emerin has been shown to interact with:

 ACTA1,
 ACTG2, 
 BANF1,
 BCLAF1,
 CTNNB1,
 GMCL1,
 LMNA,
 PSME1,
 SYNE1,
 SYNE2,
 TMEM43, and
 YTHDC1.

References

Further reading

External links 
 GeneReviews/NCBI/NIH/UW entry on Emery–Dreifuss muscular dystrophy
 

Molecular biology